Norge Luis Ruiz Loyola (born March 15, 1994) is a Cuban professional baseball pitcher in the Oakland Athletics organization.

Career
Ruiz was selected to play for the Cuba national baseball team at the 2014 Central American and Caribbean Games. Ruiz played in the Cuban National Series for Camagüey. He won the Cuban National Series Rookie of the Year Award for 2012/2013. In May 2015, Ruiz left Cuba to pursue a contract with a Major League Baseball (MLB) organization.

Ruiz won with his national team, the gold medal of the 2014 Central American and Caribbean Games in Veracruz, Mexico. Ruiz signed a minor league contract with the Oakland Athletics on December 23, 2016, that included a $2 million signing bonus.

Ruiz made his professional debut in 2017 with the DSL Athletics and was promoted to the AZL Athletics and Stockton Ports throughout the season. In 13 games started between the three teams he compiled a 5-2 record, 4.37 ERA, and a 1.32 WHIP. He began 2018 with the Midland RockHounds. He had his contract selected on August 19, 2022. He was sent outright off the roster on November 3, 2022.

References

External links

1994 births
Living people
Águilas Cibaeñas players
Arizona League Athletics players
Central American and Caribbean Games gold medalists for Cuba
Central American and Caribbean Games medalists in baseball
Competitors at the 2014 Central American and Caribbean Games
Cuban expatriate baseball players in the Dominican Republic
Cuban expatriate baseball players in the United States
Dominican Summer League Athletics players
Estrellas Orientales players
Gallos de Sancti Spiritus players
Ganaderos de Camaguey players
Lansing Lugnuts players
Las Vegas Aviators players
Major League Baseball pitchers
Major League Baseball players from Cuba
Midland RockHounds players
Nashville Sounds players
Oakland Athletics players
People from Camagüey Province
Sabuesos de Holquin players
Stockton Ports players